Université de Djibouti, more commonly known as Bahache/Université de Djibouti or simply Université, is a Djiboutian football club located in Djibouti City, Djibouti. It currently plays in the Djibouti Premier League.

Stadium
Currently the team plays at the 40000 capacity Stade du Ville.

References

External links
Soccerway

Football clubs in Djibouti